Senator McKinley may refer to:

John McKinley (1780–1852), U.S. Senator from Alabama
Paul McKinley (born 1947), Iowa State Senate
William B. McKinley (1856–1926), U.S. Senator from Illinois